There have been six national referendums in Chile since 1925.

List of referendums

a There was no electoral roll for this referendum.
Note: The percentages used in the "Yes", "No" and "Neither" columns are over the total of valid votes in each referendum. The percentages used in the "Null" and "Blank" columns are over the total votes cast in each referendum.

Current legislation

The current 1980 constitution provides for binding referendums only in the case that a constitutional reform passed by Congress is completely vetoed by the President and then re-approved by Congress by  a two-thirds majority of each chamber. In such occurrence the President has the authority to either sign the reform into law or call for a referendum. To date, the President has not exercised such power.

External links
Chilean Electoral Service - Official site

Referendums in Chile
Political history of Chile